Building a Fire is a 1914 American comedy film featuring Oliver Hardy.

Plot

Cast
 Mae Hotely as Maggie
 Julia Calhoun as Mrs. Jones
 Jerold T. Hevener as Mr. Jones
 Oliver Hardy as Policeman (as Babe Hardy)

See also
 List of American films of 1914
 Oliver Hardy filmography

External links

1914 films
American silent short films
American black-and-white films
1914 comedy films
1914 short films
Films directed by Arthur Hotaling
Silent American comedy films
American comedy short films
1910s American films